Thy Will Be Done is a 2015 Nigerian drama film, written by Tobe Osigwe, produced by Mary Njoku, co-produced and directed by Obi Emelonye. It stars Ramsey Nouah, Mercy Johnson, Jide Kosoko, Mary Njoku and Enyinna Nwigwe.

Plot
Thy Will Be Done is the story of Pius (Ramsey Nouah), a happily married pastor in charge of a large church in Lagos, Nigeria. But when his first wife (Mary Njoku) that he buried 7 years ago suddenly shows up, his world is thrown into turmoil. His present wife (Mercy Johnson) tries to fight her corner but Pius has a choice to make…between his calling and his wives; between old sins and new loyalties; between taking firm action and surrendering to God's will. Weakened by guilt and overwhelmed by sensational revelations, nothing would have prepared Pius for how rapidly things would descend into violent chaos…for hell hath no fury as a woman scorned.

Cast
Ramsey Nouah as Pius
Mercy Johnson as
Mary Njoku as
Enyinna Nwigwe as 
Jide Kosoko as
TT Temple as
Tony Aclet as

Release

The world premiere of Thy Will Be Done took place at the BFI IMAX in London on 26 February 2015. It started showing in Nigerian cinemas on 15 May 2015, and was distributed by FilmOne.

Reception
Sodas and Popcorn comments: "The best thing about this movie is probably the screenplay. Thy Will Be Done, delivers an original story that captivates and sizzles. It's a story anyone can relate to"

External links

References

English-language Nigerian films
Nigerian drama films
2015 drama films
2015 films
Films directed by Obi Emelonye
2010s English-language films